Realization is the debut album by American jazz trumpeter Eddie Henderson recorded in 1973 and released on the Capricorn label.

Reception
The Allmusic review by Richard S. Ginell called it "one of the great lost treasures of the jazz-rock era; the music is a bit looser than that of the Hancock records yet every bit as invigorating and forward-thrusting".

Track listing
All compositions by Eddie Henderson except as indicated
 "Scorpio-Libra" - 11:12
 "Mars in Libra" - 8:40
 "Anua" (Bennie Maupin) - 8:50
 "Spiritual Awakening" - 2:38
 "Revelation Realization" (Herbie Hancock, Eddie Henderson) - 8:00

Personnel
Eddie Henderson - trumpet, flugelhorn, cornet
Bennie Maupin - bass clarinet, flute, alto flute, tenor saxophone
Herbie Hancock - electric piano
Patrick Gleeson - synthesizer, organ
Buster Williams - bass, electric bass
 Billy Hart - drums, percussion
Lenny White - drums

References 

Capricorn Records albums
Eddie Henderson (musician) albums
1973 debut albums